Cardioidea is a taxonomic superfamily of saltwater clams, marine bivalve molluscs consisting of the extant Cardiidae (cockles) and the extinct Pterocardiidae.

Taxonomy
These families are assigned to Cardioidea:

Family: Cardiidae Lamarck, 1809
Subfamily Cardiinae Lamarck, 1809
Subfamily Clinocardiinae Kafanov, 1975
Subfamily Fraginae Stewart, 1930
Subfamily Laevicardiinae Keen, 1951
Subfamily Lahilliinae Finlay & Marwick, 1937†
Subfamily Lymnocardiinae Stoliczka, 1870
Subfamily Orthocardiinae J. A. Schneider, 2002
Subfamily Protocardiinae Bronn, 1849†
Subfamily Trachycardiinae Stewart, 1930
Subfamily Tridacninae Lamarck, 1819
 Family: Pterocardiidae Scarlato & Starobogatov, 1979
Genus Pterocardia Bayan, 1874
Species Pterocardia alata Rollier, 1912
Species Pterocardia brouzetense Cossmann, 1907
Species Pterocardia cochleata (Quenstedt, 1852)
Species Pterocardia corallina (Leymerie, 1845)
Species Pterocardia couloni Rollier, 1912
Species Pterocardia subminuta (d'Orbigny, 1850)
Species Pterocardia valfinense Rollier, 1912
Species Pterocardia wimmisense Rollier, 1912

References

Mollusc superfamilies
Taxa named by Jean-Baptiste Lamarck